Ganapavaram mandal is one of the 28 mandals in Eluru district of the Indian state of Andhra Pradesh. It is under the administration of Eluru revenue division and the headquarters are located at Ganapavaram. Ganapavaram Mandal is bounded by Nidamarru Mandal towards west, Pentapadu Mandal towards North, Undi Mandal towards South, Unguturu Mandal towards North . Tadepalligudem, Bhimavaram, Tanuku, Eluru are the nearby Cities to Ganapavaram. It is located 55 km from Eluru and 22 km from Bhimavaram.

Demographics 

 census, the mandal had a population of 64,963 with 18,622 households. The total population constitute, 32,519 males and 32,444 females —a sex ratio of 997 females per 1000 males. 5,894 children are in the age group of 0–6 years, of which 2,957 are boys and 2,937 are girls. The literacy rate stands at 68.35% with 44,406 literates.

The mandal does not have any sort of Urban population and Area.

Governance

Administration 

 census, the mandal has thirty villages and twenty five panchayats, of which all of them are villages. Velagapalle is the smallest Village and Ganapavaram is the biggest Village in terms of population
The settlements in the mandal are listed below:

Notes
(†) Mandal headquarter

Politics 
Ganapavaram mandal is one of the mandals under  Unguturu (Assembly constituency), which in turn represents Eluru (Lok Sabha constituency) of Andhra Pradesh.

Education 
The primary and secondary school education is imparted by mandal parishad, zilla parishad, government and private schools, which are both aided and unaided, under the administration of the School Education Department of the state. The medium of instruction followed by different schools are English, Telugu.

Important colleges in Ganapavaram are S C B R Govt Junior College, Chanakya Junior College, (CH.VPMR) Government Degree College and Smt. Gottumukkala Swaraswathi Degree College. There are many schools in Ganapavaram. Gurajada Vidyaniketan, Vidya Jyothi Merit School and Maria Montessori School teaches in English medium whereas, Zilla Parishad High Schools in Telugu medium.

See also 
 List of mandals in Andhra Pradesh

References

Mandals in Eluru district